Surrounded is an upcoming American drama film directed by Anthony Mandler. It stars Letitia Wright, Jamie Bell, Jeffrey Donovan, Brett Gelman, and Michael K. Williams in his final performance.

Premise
A female Buffalo Soldier disguised as a man travelling west to claim a gold mine must keep a dangerous outlaw away from her gang.

Cast
Letitia Wright as Moses Washington
Jamie Bell
Michael K. Williams
Jeffrey Donovan as Wheeler
Brett Gelman as Mr. Fields

Production
It was announced in October 2020 that Letitia Wright, Jamie Bell and Michael K. Williams were set to star in the film, to be directed by Anthony Mandler. Principal photography began in November 2020, in New Mexico. In December 2020, Jeffrey Donovan and Brett Gelman joined the cast.

References

External links
 

2023 Western (genre) films
American drama films
Bron Studios films
Cross-dressing in American films
Films directed by Anthony Mandler
Films shot in New Mexico
Lionsgate films
Mandalay Pictures films